Camas may refer to:
Camas Bookstore and Infoshop in British Columbia, Canada.
Camas, Seville, Spain
Camas, Idaho, United States
Camas, Montana, United States
Camas, Washington, United States
Camas County, Idaho, United States
Camas prairie, several areas in the western United States
Camas Tuath, a bay on the Isle of Mull, UK
Camas (magazine), a literary periodical
Camassia, a plant genus

See also

Deathcamas (disambiguation)

pt:Camas